National Route 341 is a national highway of Japan connecting Kazuno, Akita and Yurihonjō, Akita in Japan, with a total length of 168.7 km (104.83 mi).

References

National highways in Japan
Roads in Akita Prefecture